Acanthothecis aquilonia is a species of corticolous lichen in the family Graphidaceae, and was first described in 2008 by Alan Archer and John Alan Elix. The holotype (CANB 769685.1) was collected in Australia's Kakadu National Park from a tree trunk in lowland monsoon forest, on 10 August 2005 by Alan Archer.

References

aquilonia
Lichen species
Lichens of Australia
Lichens described in 2008
Taxa named by Alan W. Archer
Taxa named by John Alan Elix